George 'Snowy' Lambert (9 September 1887 – 20 March 1938) was an Australian rules footballer who played for Fitzroy in the early years of the VFL.

A half back flanker, Lambert played with Fitzroy for nine seasons and won their best and fairest award in his first season, sharing it with Bill Walker. He struggled to hold his place in the side during the second half of his career and missed out on playing in both of the two premierships Fitzroy won while he was at the club.

References

External links

 

1887 births
1938 deaths
Fitzroy Football Club players
Mitchell Medal winners
Australian rules footballers from Melbourne
People from Fitzroy, Victoria